Raymon Kim (born May 5, 1975) is a South Korean-Canadian chef and television personality. He was a former cast member of the variety show Law of the Jungle in Indochina (episodes 154 – 162). He also hosted Sam and Raymon Cooking Time from 2011 to 2012 with Sam Kim.

References

External links

1975 births
Living people
Canadian television chefs
Canadian people of Korean descent
South Korean television chefs
People from Seoul
South Korean emigrants to Canada
South Korean chefs
Canadian male chefs